Regulator of nonsense transcripts 3B is a protein that in humans is encoded by the UPF3B gene.

This gene encodes a protein that is part of a post-splicing multiprotein complex involved in both mRNA nuclear export and mRNA surveillance. The encoded protein is one of two functional homologs to yeast Upf3p. mRNA surveillance detects exported mRNAs with truncated open reading frames and initiates nonsense-mediated mRNA decay (NMD). When translation ends upstream from the last exon-exon junction, this triggers NMD to degrade mRNAs containing premature stop codons. This protein binds to the mRNA and remains bound after nuclear export, acting as a nucleocytoplasmic shuttling protein. It forms with Y14 a complex that binds specifically 20 nt upstream of exon-exon junctions. This gene is located on the long arm of chromosome X. Two splice variants encoding different isoforms have been found for this gene.

Interactions
UPF3B has been shown to interact with UPF2 and UPF1.

References

Further reading